Nub Beamer (born February 14, 1936) is a former all-star Canadian Football League fullback.

High school

Beamer as a senior became the first football player at Roseburg High (Roseburg, OR) to receive first-team all-state honours.

College

Beamer accepted a scholarship offer from Oregon State University and spent the next four years in Corvallis. He played a major role on the 1956,1957 and 1958 Beaver teams.  He played in the 1957 Rose Bowl loss to the Iowa Hawkeyes, scoring a touchdown.

Professional

He moved north to Canada in 1959, playing with the BC Lions. He was a bruising fullback, and was an all-star twice, in 1962 when he rushed for 1161 yards (only the second Leo, after Willie Fleming to do so), and in 1963 (914 yards) when he played in their Grey Cup loss. He rushed for 3662 yards in his career.  A pair of concussions in 1963 forced Beamer to retire and become a stockbroker.

References

1936 births
Living people
American players of Canadian football
BC Lions players
Oregon State Beavers football players
Players of American football from Oregon
Sportspeople from Roseburg, Oregon